Pan-Atlantic University is a private, non-profit educational institution in Lekki, Lagos State.

Timeline 
The university had its origin as the Lagos Business School (LBS), established in 1991. The federal government approved the university as Pan-African University in 2002, and the LBS became its first school. The Ajah Campus was completed in 2003 and in 2010 work began on the Ibeju-Lekki campus.

In September 2011 the university launched the Virtual Museum of Modern Nigerian Art, a website created by Jess Castellote, a Spanish architect that includes over 400 works from 81 artists, including pioneering Nigerian artists such as Aina Onabolu and Bruce Onobrakpeya and emerging artists such as Richardson Ovbiebo and Babalola Lawson.

In November and December 2011 the EDC, for the first time, marked the Global Entrepreneurship Week (GEW), with a series of events in Lagos. 
Many Nigerians have ambitions to start a business, and the conference was extremely well-attended.
EDC has been the GEW host for Nigeria since then. The University's Enterprise Development Centre (EDC) works with the Small and Medium Enterprise (SME) Department of the International Finance Corporation (IFC) to provide the SME Toolkit Nigeria. This gives free business management information and training to small businesses.

In July 2011 British Prime Minister David Cameron spoke at the Pan-Atlantic University in Lagos, discussing aid, trade and democracy. He spoke in favor of an African free trade area, and of increased trade with Britain.

In May 2013 its name was changed to Pan-Atlantic University, in order to avoid confusion with the Pan-African University of the African Union.

On 17 November 2014 the University launched its first ever undergraduate programmes in its new campus at Ibeju-Lekki.

On 19 October 2019 the Pan-Atlantic University's Art museum, YSMA  will officially be open to the public with two simultaneous inaugural exhibitions.

Alumni 
 Yomi Owope
Babajide Sanwo-Olu
Ibukun Awosika
Seyi Makinde
Femi Adesina
Ubong King
Gbenga Daniel
Gbemi Olateru Olagbegi
Femi Jacobs
Kemi Lala Akindoju
Ibidunni Ighodalo
Olalekan Olude
Jadesola Osiberu

References

 
Educational institutions established in 2002
Universities and colleges in Nigeria
2002 establishments in Nigeria
Private universities and colleges in Nigeria